K. Subbarayan (born 10 August 1947) is a member of the 17th Lok Sabha of India. He represents the Tiruppur Lok Sabha constituency of Tamil Nadu and is a member of the Communist Party of India (CPI) political party. He represented the Coimbatore Lok Sabha constituency of Tamil Nadu in 14th Lok Sabha. He was also elected twice for the Tamil Nadu legislative assembly from the Tiruppur assembly constituency.

The CPI in Tamil Nadu allied with the Dravida Munnetra Kazhagam as part of the Democratic Progressive Alliance for the 2004 Lok Sabha elections. The party was allocated two seats to contest under the terms of agreement, from which Subbarayan was selected to fight Coimbatore. The seat, whose economy was largely based on a textile industry that was contracting due to recession, had been won in 1998 and 1999 by C. P. Radhakrishnan of the Bharatiya Janata Party. Aside from issues relating to unemployment, a major local issue in the 2004 campaign was the situation regarding drought and water supplies. Radhakrishnan's past success had come from exploiting communal tensions caused by a bombing campaign in the area by the now-banned Islamic fundamentalist Al Ummah group but this was no longer a significant issue.

Subbarayan had previously been elected to the Tamil Nadu legislative assembly from the Tiruppur constituency for the periods 1984-89 and 1996-2001. Tiruppur is Subbarayan's home town. He was runner-up to C. Govindasamy of the Communist Party of India (Marxist) in the 1989 election.

Subbarayan decided not to contest the 2016 state assembly elections.

References

Further reading 

Living people
1947 births
Communist Party of India politicians from Tamil Nadu
India MPs 2004–2009
Lok Sabha members from Tamil Nadu
Tamil Nadu MLAs 1996–2001
Politicians from Coimbatore
People from Tiruppur
India MPs 2019–present
Tamil Nadu MLAs 1985–1989